Seneca Township is one of the fifteen townships of Seneca County, Ohio, United States.  The 2010 census found 1,622 people in the township.

Geography
Located in the southwestern part of the county, it borders the following townships:
Hopewell Township - north
Clinton Township - northeast corner
Eden Township - east
Sycamore Township, Wyandot County - southeast corner
Tymochtee Township, Wyandot County - south
Crawford Township, Wyandot County - southwest corner
Big Spring Township - west
Loudon Township - northwest corner

No municipalities are located in Seneca Township.

Name and history
Seneca Township was established in 1820.

Statewide, other Seneca Townships are located in Monroe and Noble counties.

Government
The township is governed by a three-member board of trustees, who are elected in November of odd-numbered years to a four-year term beginning on the following January 1. Two are elected in the year after the presidential election and one is elected in the year before it. There is also an elected township fiscal officer, who serves a four-year term beginning on April 1 of the year after the election, which is held in November of the year before the presidential election. Vacancies in the fiscal officership or on the board of trustees are filled by the remaining trustees.

References

External links
County website

Townships in Seneca County, Ohio
Townships in Ohio